The Canon EF-M 15-45mm f/3.5-6.3 IS STM is an interchangeable zoom lens, covering fields of view from wide-angle to short telephoto, for the Canon EF-M system of Canon Inc. mirrorless interchangeable-lens camera. It was announced by Canon on October 13, 2015, together with the new Canon EOS M10 camera.  The lens uses STM (stepping motor) technology and a collapsible design which takes up less space when the lens is not in use.

The lens is available in two colors, black and silver.

References

External links
 Technical Specifications

Canon EF-M-mount lenses
Camera lenses introduced in 2015